Bengt Leandersson is a Swedish ski-orienteering competitor. He won a silver medal in the sprint distance at the 2004 World Ski Orienteering Championships in Åsarna/Östersund in Sweden.

References

Swedish orienteers
Male orienteers
Ski-orienteers
Year of birth missing (living people)
Living people